Guzmania morreniana is a plant species in the genus Guzmania. This species is native to Bolivia and Ecuador.

References

morreniana
Flora of Bolivia
Flora of Ecuador